Lake Ray Roberts (formally Ray Roberts Lake) is an artificial  American reservoir located  north of Denton, Texas, between the cities of Pilot Point, Texas and Sanger, Texas. It is filled by a tributary of the Trinity River.

It was named after Ray Roberts (a local congressman who supported creation of the lake) in 1980.

The reservoir is located in, and supplies water to, Cooke, Grayson, and Denton counties.  

On March 2, 1945, the U.S. Congress approved the River & Harbors Act of 1945 which, among many projects, provided for the construction of Benbrook Lake, Grapevine Lake, Lavon Lake and Ray Roberts Lake, as well as modifications to the existing Garza Dam for the construction of Lewisville Lake.  Ray Roberts Dam, an earthen structure 141 feet high, is owned and operated by the United States Army Corps of Engineers.

Ray Roberts is also used for recreation and is home to the Ray Roberts Lake State Park.

The construction of Lake Ray Roberts resulted in the dissolution of several communities in the surrounding area. One notable community, which surrounded St. James Baptist Church, was given funds to build a new church in the nearby town of Pilot Point.

See also

 Trinity River Authority

References

External links
U.S. Army Corps of Engineers: Ray Roberts Lake
U.S. Army Corps of Engineers: Corps Lake Gateway – Ray Roberts Lake
Texas Parks and Wildlife: Ray Roberts Lake Wildlife Management Area

Reservoirs in Texas
Trinity River (Texas)
Bodies of water of Denton County, Texas
Bodies of water of Cooke County, Texas
Bodies of water of Grayson County, Texas
Dams in Texas
United States Army Corps of Engineers dams
Protected areas of Denton County, Texas
Protected areas of Cooke County, Texas
Protected areas of Grayson County, Texas